Poyushchie vmeste (lit.: Singing Together) is a Russian electro-dance band, whose song "Takogo kak Putin" was a hit across Russia and created worldwide fame for the band. It topped the Russian Music Charts in 2002. The genesis of this song was covered in the documentary "Sound Tracks: Music Without Borders", made by the Talbot Players.

Band members are Yana Dayneko (sister of Victoria Dayneko) and Irina Kozlova.

References

External links 
 PBS Documentary about the genesis of the band and its feature song
 BBC News Article
 Video of the band's feature song 
 Original Russian version with English subtitles
 English version

Russian pop music groups
Russian girl groups